The Palestinian is a 66-minute TV documentary from 1977. It was produced by and starred Vanessa Redgrave, and directed by Roy Battersby.

Controversy

The movie was perceived by some critics as anti-Israeli The Anti-Defamation League's honorary chairman criticized the film, stating that some of the responses of the people she interviews weren't translated from Arabic, that the film showed children training with guns and that the phrase, "Kill the enemy!" kept being repeated. The president of Actors Equity in the United States criticized the film's interview with the chairman of the Palestine Liberation Organization (PLO), Yasser Arafat, in which he said that the only solution to the Middle East problem is the liquidation of the State of Israel, and Redgrave responded with, "Certainly".

Redgrave won the Academy Award for Best Supporting Actress for her role in Julia. Her nomination drew attention and criticism, and the ceremony was picketed by both the Jewish Defense League (JDL) and counter-protesters waving PLO flags. In her acceptance speech at the Oscars, Redgrave made a short speech, saying "In the last few weeks you have stood firm and you have refused to be intimidated by the threat of a small bunch of Zionist hoodlums, whose behaviour is an insult to the stature of Jews all over the world, and to their great and heroic record of struggle against fascism and oppression". Regarding her use of the phrase "Zionist hoodlums", the Daily Telegraph later said, "It’s clear now that she was referring to the extremists of the Jewish Defense League who had offered a bounty to have her killed. Yet in the context of her support for the PLO, this was a spectacularly ill-chosen phrase, one that made it possible for Redgrave’s detractors to imply that she meant the whole state of Israel, and thus damn her as an anti-Semite for years to come". Academy Award winner Paddy Chayefsky responded later during the ceremony while presenting an award, saying "if I expect to live with myself tomorrow morning" he had to address the ceremony being exploited for politics.

Later that year, at 4:26 a.m on June 15, 1978, a bomb exploded in front of the Doheny Plaza theatre in Los Angeles, where the film's scheduled opening later that evening was postponed a day. A member of the JDL was later convicted for the incident and sentenced to a three month "thorough psychological examination" with the California Youth Authority.

References

1977 television films
1977 films
British television documentaries
Documentary films about the Israeli–Palestinian conflict
1977 documentary films